is a former Japanese football player and manager. and He is the currently manager J1 League club of Nagoya Grampus.

Club career
Hasegawa was educated at and played for Shimizu Higashi High School. He won the national high school championship with his teammates including Katsumi Oenoki and Takumi Horiike. He continued his study and football at University of Tsukuba where he won the Kanto University League title in 1987.

After graduating from the university in 1988, he joined Japan Soccer League side Nissan Motors (current Yokohama F. Marinos). He contributed to the club winning the Emperor's Cup twice in 1988 and 1989. When Japan's first-ever professional league J1 League started, Shimizu S-Pulse was founded in his local city. He joined the club in 1992 and re-united with his high school teammates Oenoki and Horiike. He helped the club to win the J.League Cup in 1996. He retired as a Shimizu player after the club won the second stage of the J1 League 1999 season. He played 207 league matches and scored 45 league goals in 7 seasons at Shimizu.

International career
Hasegawa was capped 27 times and scored 4 goals for the Japanese national team between 1989 and 1995. His first international appearance came on January 20, 1989 in a friendly against Iran in Teheran. He scored for the first time for his country on June 11, 1989 in a 1990 World Cup qualification against Indonesia at Nishigaoka Soccer Stadium in Tokyo. He was a member of the Japan squad who participated in the 1994 World Cup qualification for the 1994 World Cup. In the crucial last match, Hasegawa was substituted in the 59th minute by Masahiro Fukuda and watched from the bench a late Iraqi equaliser dashed Japan's hope to qualify for the finals in the US, the match that the Japanese fans now refer to as the Agony of Doha.

Coaching career
After retiring from the game, Hasegawa started working as a pundit for national television NHK. He was also installed as the general manager of two university clubs, Hamamatsu University and Fuji Tokoha University (2000–2001). He became the manager of Hamamatsu University and lead them to win the Tokai University League title and the Shizuoka Prefectural qualification for the Emperor's Cup. He acquired the S-class coaching license that was required to manage a J1 League club in 2004 and became the manager of his old club Shimizu S-Pulse in 2005. The club struggled and narrowly escaped relegation in the 2005 season but they fought back strongly in the 2006 season and finished 4th in the league; a position equaled in 2007. In 2008 Hasegawa led S-Pulse to the final of the J.League Cup and a fifth-placed finish in the league, a placing which included them being the strongest performing team in the second half of the season. He was rewarded with an extended contract which will keep him at S-Pulse until 2010. He left Shimizu after he led the club to the final of 2010-11 Emperor's Cup when his contract was expired.

Hawegawa was appointed as a manager at J2 League club Gamba Osaka in 2013. The club won the champions in 2013 and was promoted to J1 League. In 2014, the club won all three major title in Japan; J1 League, J.League Cup and Emperor's Cup. He also was selected J.League Manager of the Year awards. In 2015, the club won the champions at Emperor's Cup and 2nd place at J1 League and J.League Cup. He resigned end of 2017 season.

In 2018, Hasegawa signed with FC Tokyo. In 2021, after a three year spell in which the club finished 6th, 2nd, 6th, and 9th in four respective seasons, Hasegawa resigned after an 8 - 0 loss to 2nd place Yokohama F. Marinos. 

Shortly after the conclusion of the J1 league's 21/22 season, Hasegawa signed a contract with J1 league club Nagoya Grampus.

Career statistics

Club

International

Managerial
Update; March 18, 2023

In popular culture
In popular manga and anime series Chibi Maruko-chan, a boy called Kenta kun occasionally makes an appearance. He loves football and is a classmate of title character Chibi Maruko. Momoko Sakura, the author of the manga, created this character after Hasegawa. Sakura and Hasegawa attended the same primary school during the same period.

Honours

As a coach 
Gamba Osaka
J.League Division 1: 2014
J.League Division 2: 2013
J.League Cup: 2014
Emperor's Cup: 2014
Japanese Super Cup: 2015

Individual
J.League Manager of the Year: 2014

References

External links
 
 
 Japan National Football Team Database
 
 
 Kenta Hasegawa at Giant Bomb

1965 births
Living people
University of Tsukuba alumni
Association football people from Shizuoka Prefecture
Japanese footballers
Japan international footballers
Japan Soccer League players
J1 League players
Yokohama F. Marinos players
Shimizu S-Pulse players
1995 King Fahd Cup players
Japanese football managers
J1 League managers
J2 League managers
Shimizu S-Pulse managers
Gamba Osaka managers
FC Tokyo managers
Nagoya Grampus managers
Footballers at the 1990 Asian Games
Association football forwards
Asian Games competitors for Japan